Li(f)e is the fourth solo studio album by American rapper Sage Francis. It was released on Anti- on May 11, 2010. It peaked at number 145 on the Billboard 200 chart. The cover art was created by Shepard Fairey. "Slow Man" and "The Best of Times" were released as the singles from the album.

Critical reception

At Metacritic, which assigns a weighted average score out of 100 to reviews from mainstream critics, the album received an average score of 68, based on 15 reviews, indicating "generally favorable reviews".

Brett Uddenberg of URB gave the album 4.5 stars out of 5, saying, "Backed by an unusual consortium of indie rockers, Rhode Island's finest dissects the human condition with brutal honesty and unparalleled wit." Meanwhile, Jesse Cataldo of Slant Magazine gave the album 2 stars out of 5, describing it as "a collection of songs that never fully gets off the ground, spooling out like never-ending spoken introductions, as the rapper futilely waits for his beats to come to life."

Track listing

Personnel
Credits adapted from liner notes.

 Sage Francis – vocals
 Brian Deck – production, mixing
 Greg Calbi – mastering
 Shepard Fairey – artwork

Charts

References

External links
 
 

2010 albums
Sage Francis albums
Anti- (record label) albums
Albums with cover art by Shepard Fairey